Rambler Channel is a body of water in Hong Kong that separates Tsing Yi Island from Tsuen Wan and Kwai Chung in the New Territories. The channel separates the two landmasses by 900 metres at its widest point. 

Historically, the channel was known as Tsing Yi Mun (青衣門) and Tsing Yi Channel (青衣海峽).

The shoreline of the channel has changed rapidly in the last several decades, owing to the development of Tsuen Wan New Town and the Kwai Chung Container Port. Before extensive reclamation, Gin Drinkers Bay was located along the eastern shore of the channel, and Tsing Yi Bay was located along the western shore. Three islands (Nga Ying Chau, Pillar Island and Mong Chau) once stood in the channel as well.

Port facilities
 Kwai Tsing Container Terminals

Transport

Six road bridges and one rail bridge span the channel:
 Ting Kau Bridge, connecting Tsing Yi Island with Tuen Mun Road and Tai Lam Tunnel
 Tsing Tsuen Bridge, usually known as the Tsing Yi North Bridge
 Tsing Lai Bridge, the sole railway bridge, used by the MTR metro system
 Cheung Tsing Bridge, part of Tsing Kwai Highway (Route 3), leading to Cheung Tsing Tunnel
 Tsing Yi Bridge, usually known as the Tsing Yi South Bridge
 Kwai Tsing Bridge, usually known as the second Tsing Yi South Bridge
 Stonecutters Bridge, connecting Tsing Yi Island with Stonecutters Island

Ferry piers
 Tsuen Wan Ferry Pier (demolished for Tsuen Wan West station)
 Tsing Yi Ferry Pier (ferry services to this pier have ceased)

See also
 Rambler Channel Typhoon Shelter

References

External links

Channels of Hong Kong
Tsing Yi